Olivia Carlsson (born 2 March 1995) is a Swedish ice hockey player captain of MoDo Hockey Dam of the Swedish Women's Hockey League (SDHL). She has been a member of the Swedish national ice hockey team since 2012.

Carlsson represented Sweden in the women's ice hockey tournament at the 2018 Winter Olympics and in the IIHF Women's World Championships in 2013, 2015, 2016, 2017, and 2019.

References

External links

1995 births
Living people
Swedish women's ice hockey forwards
Sportspeople from Karlstad
Ice hockey players at the 2018 Winter Olympics
Ice hockey players at the 2022 Winter Olympics
Olympic ice hockey players of Sweden
Modo Hockey Dam players